Party Lights may refer to:

"Party Lights" (Claudine Clark song), a 1962 single by Claudine Clark
"Party Lights", a 1977 song by Natalie Cole
"Party Lights", a song by Bruce Springsteen on his 2015 album The Ties That Bind: The River Collection

See also
DJ lighting